Gilles Simon won in the final 5–7, 7–6(9–7), after Michaël Llodra retired due to an arm injury.

Players

Draw

Finals

Red group
Standings are determined by: 1. number of wins; 2. number of matches; 3. in two-players-ties, head-to-head records; 4. in three-players-ties, percentage of sets won, or of games won; 5. steering-committee decision.

Blue group
Standings are determined by: 1. number of wins; 2. number of matches; 3. in two-players-ties, head-to-head records; 4. in three-players-ties, percentage of sets won, or of games won; 5. steering-committee decision.

External links
Masters France official website

Masters France
- Draw, 2008 Masters France

ru:Masters France 2008